The javanese doughnut, also known in Indonesian as donat jawa (Javanese: donat jawa or gembus) is a traditional doughnut snack, typically savoury, made of cassava instead of potato or flour. This doughnut is quite popular in Javanese cuisine in Java, especially in Central Java, Yogyakarta and East Java, Indonesia. It is usually served during Javanese occasion, such as wedding parties, wayang shows, ketoprak theater, and Ramadan.

See also

Cuisine of Indonesia
Donat kentang
Javanese cuisine
Kue
List of Indonesian dishes

References

Indonesian snack foods
Doughnuts
Cassava dishes
Wedding food